Melinda Windsor (born June 25, 1944) was the pseudonym used by a 21-year-old student at the University of California, Los Angeles who was Playboy magazine's Playmate of the Month for its February 1966 issue. Her centerfold was photographed by Tony Marco. She received her bachelor's degree in 1966.

Windsor was born in Akron, Ohio. She was working as an insurance rater and taking night classes at UCLA. She was going to use the money she earned posing for Playboy to finish her degree and then attend graduate school; her goal was to get a PhD and become a teacher.

A small controversy arose after her appearance in Playboy. In a newspaper article, the university stated that they had no one by the name of "Melinda Windsor" enrolled. Readers of the magazine wrote to Playboy asking if they had their facts straight. Playboy responded that "Melinda" was a student at UCLA in the fall of 1965 when she posed, but was not enrolled during the winter of 1966 and that she had used a pseudonym.

Windsor was photographed by Alexas Urba for the January 1967 issue of Playboy, and by Morton Tadder for the fall 1967 issue of VIP magazine.

Identity research 
In a 2016 Akron, Ohio newspaper column in the Akron Beacon-Journal, journalist Bob Dyer requested information about Windsor, hoping to honor Akron's "mystery playmate" on the 50th anniversary of her appearance in Playboy. He subsequently published in his column what he believed to be her real name and some details of her life, gleaned by a reader from extensive searching in a digitized newspaper database.

See also 
 List of people in Playboy 1960–1969

References

External links 
 

1944 births
Living people
People from Akron, Ohio
1960s Playboy Playmates